Javier Martínez (born 1 January 1953) is a Spanish sprinter. He competed in the men's 4 × 100 metres relay at the 1976 Summer Olympics.

References

1953 births
Living people
Athletes (track and field) at the 1976 Summer Olympics
Spanish male sprinters
Olympic athletes of Spain
Place of birth missing (living people)